Banff Sunshine Village (formerly Sunshine Village) is a ski resort in western Canada, located on the Continental Divide of the Canadian Rockies within Banff National Park in Alberta and Mount Assiniboine Provincial Park in British Columbia. It is one of three major ski resorts located in the Banff National Park. Because of its location straddling the Continental Divide, Sunshine receives more snow than the neighbouring ski resorts.

Banff Sunshine ski runs and lifts are accessed via an eight-person high-speed gondola. It moves passengers from the parking lot (or bus terminal) to Goat's Eye mountain in 10 minutes and to the upper Village area in 18 minutes. There are 9 chairlifts and 134 trails within the alpine valley formed by the three mountains (Mount Standish, Lookout Mountain, and Goat's Eye Mountain) that constitute Banff Sunshine. In summer, the resort runs a shuttle bus service to its attractive walking trails and alpine meadows.

History
The first explorer that passed through the Sunshine area was Governor George Simpson  of Hudson's Bay Company. His party passed through the area in 1841 seeking new quicker routes into the Columbia District. His diary noted "Hole in the Wall" Goat's Eye mountain and he left a blaze in a tree that has since been preserved in the Banff Natural History Museum. The next significant exploration party was the Palliser Expedition in the late 1850s; Mt. Borgeau, is named for one of its members.

Everything changed with the building of the Canadian Pacific Railway and its arrival in Banff in the late 1880s.  Bill Peyto may have been the first person to bring real tourists through the Sunshine area. The eccentric Peyto was a trapper and prospector. He was also a competent guide, as his rugged life gave him the skills required to face the often harsh realities of nature. In the 1890s Peyto would guide tourists through the Sunshine Meadows to the base of Mt. Assiniboine, the highest peak in the Southern Continental Ranges of the Canadian Rockies.

By the 1920s, Sunshine Meadows had become a popular camping site. Pat Brewster, the youngest son of dairyman John Brewster, was the first to regularly bring tourists for overnight camping at Sunshine Meadows. This area was nicknamed Tee Pee Town on account of the many tents that overnight campers would set there.  Upon reaching the top of the Tee Pee Town chair lift today, one is looking over the same Sunshine Meadows that were busy with campers those many decades earlier.

In 1928, the Canadian Pacific Railway built a log cabin lodge for the use of The Trail Riders of the Canadian Rockies, a club of horse enthusiasts who were sponsored by the tourist-friendly railway. This cabin was certainly not the first lodge built in the region (Bill Peyto’s cabin near Simpson’s pass was built more than 30 years earlier), but it is now the oldest building at Banff Sunshine and is known as the Old Sunshine Lodge. Housing Mad Trapper's Saloon and Bruno's Bistro, the OSL is situated at the timberline above what was then known as Wheeler’s Flats and just below a vast expanse of high alpine meadows.

In March 1929, Cliff White and Cyril Paris, two local extreme sports enthusiasts, created a plan to use the CPR cabin as an overnight point in their ski trek over the great divide. Unfortunately they could not find the cabin that night and were forced to sleep in a dug-out in the snow. Upon waking in the morning they discovered that they had only just missed the CPR cabin. These two men were the first to ski what is now known as Banff Sunshine.

In 1934 Jim and Pat Brewster leased the cabin from the CPR and began offering ski vacations. They bought the lodge in 1936.  In 1939 they hired Swiss guide Bruno Engler as the first ski instructor. In 1941 a rope tow was built.  The Brewster's owned the area until 1951 when it was sold to George Encil, who also owned nearby Mt. Norquay. He added "Village" to the name and made numerous improvements including the addition of a "Ski-Kuli" lift. 

In 1961 the resort was purchased by local Banff businessman Cliff White, Jr. and his wife Bev. Their vision has shaped the resort.  Partnering with Power Corporation Resorts, they built the Sunshine Inn  (now Sunshine Mountain Lodge), the Daylodge and opened up the slopes of the Continental (Great) Divide Chairlift.  He ushered in the modern era with the opening of the first gondola, which replaced bus access to the ski area, in 1980,

In 1981, the resort was purchased by Ralph T. Scurfield of Calgary. Since his passing in 1985, his sons,  Ralph, Sergei, and John have run the resort and made many improvements. In 1988, the resort's first high speed quad opened with the construction of the Angel Express on Lookout Mountain. In 1995, the resort expanded onto Goat's Eye Mountain, constructing a Poma high speed quad to service the new terrain. A year later, the Great Divide double chairlift to the summit of Lookout Mountain was replaced with an extended high speed quad, also built by Poma. In 2000, Poma replaced the two chairlifts on the mountain in between Goat's Eye and Lookout Mountains. The Wheeler double chairlift was replaced with a high speed quad, the Wolverine Express, and the Fireweed T-Bar was replaced with a fixed-grip quad, Jackrabbit.

In 1991, the resort hosted Downhill and super -G events for the 1991 Winter Deaflympics.

In 2001, the aging gondola that had brought guests up to the mountain since 1980 was replaced with a modern gondola built by Poma, reusing the same line and many of the original towers. At the same time, the WaWa T-Bar was removed and a fixed grip quad was built by Poma to replace it. In 2003, the Standish double chairlift was upgraded by Leitner Poma to a high speed quad, providing high speed lift service to Mount Standish. 

In 2010, the Strawberry triple chairlift was removed and replaced with a used Doppelmayr CTEC high speed quad. The Strawberry Express had originally been built as a temporary lift at Whistler Blackcomb in 2009 for the 2010 Winter Olympics to transport spectators from the Creekside base area to the finish line on the downhill course. In 2015, the last remaining double chairlift on the mountain, Tee Pee Town, was removed and replaced by Doppelmayr with a bubble high speed quad containing heated seats.

Banff Sunshine now hosts some 500,000 skiers and snowboarders annually over a ski season that stretches from early November to late May.

In 2019,  Parks Canada and the resort reached an agreement over future expansion and leasehold area. The owners were forced to agree to a 42-year lease with an agreement to then give Sunshine Village Ski Resort to the Crown for $1, or sever and remove every facility and return the land to its natural state.

Amenities

There are 134 named runs spreading out over three mountains (Goat Eye's Mountain, Lookout Mountain and Mount Standish) and the two provinces, (Alberta and British Columbia). Lift service includes a gondola, chairs, High-speed quad with heated seats and bubbles and magic carpet lifts. Banff Sunshine is the first ski resort in Canada to feature a High-speed quad with heated seats and bubbles. This chair was constructed in 2015 and is known as Teepee Town XL. The annual snowfall is up to thirty feet (over nine meters). 

It is the only ski-in/ski-out lodge in Banff-Lake Louise. Guests can purchase a Marmot Card to receive discounts on lift tickets. This card allows guests to ski at a discounted rate at both Banff Sunshine and Marmot Basin in Jasper and includes a number of free ski days. 

Due to its location in Banff National Park and the development restrictions that apply, parking at Banff Sunshine has long been in limited supply. When the main parking lot fills, visitors park along the access road and use a shuttle bus to get to the base lodge. This has been a source of friction with Parks Canada over the years, due to Parks Canada's concern about avalanche risks along the road. In 2017, a court overturned a Parks Canada imposed ban on access road parking. In the summer of 2021, the parking lot was expanded and 250 new spots were added.

Events 
The ski season begins in early November and traditionally ends in late May, on the Victoria Day long weekend, with an event called the Slush Cup. Slush Cup participants attempt to ski down in front of a very large crowd of crazily dressed spectators, jump onto a pool of water (approx. 50'/ 15m long & 8' / 2.5m deep) and skim across the pool to the other side. All successful participants get raucous applause and bragging rights. Sunshine just celebrated its 90th Slush Cup in May 2018. Banff Sunshine has hosted many alpine ski and snowboard events.

Terrain
Banff Sunshine offers terrain for all levels of skiers and boarders. It offers a mix of gentle tree-lined beginner slopes, wide open above tree-line intermediate and expert terrain. Visitors to the resort will often access one of the eight adjacent backcountry terrain such as 'Wawa Ridge' or Mount Assiniboine Provincial Park in British Columbia. Avalanche rescue equipment is recommended for most backcountry areas. Rescue equipment is a requirement for access to the freeride zones of Delirium Dive and Wild West where the entrances are via a gate that remains locked at all times unless it detects a working avalanche transceiver on each person that passes through it. The entrance for Wild West is located on Goats Eye Mountain while the entrance to Delirium Dive is located near the Great Divide. Sunshine also features a 5km ski-out which brings guests from the village to the gondola base.

Lift system

Banff Sunshine 10 has chairlifts, and 2 magic carpetss.

Popular culture
Many movies and TV specials have been filmed in the Sunshine area.  Banff Sunshine was utilized as a task destination for the season-ending episode of the popular American reality television show The Amazing Race 5 (original broadcast date September 2004). In the final 13th leg of this race, the three remaining teams took taxicabs from the Calgary International Airport to Banff Sunshine. After riding the gondola to the base of Lookout Mountain, the contestants donned snowshoes before making the approximate 2,000 vertical foot hike to the top ridge of the Great Divide (elevation 8,900 feet). Sunshine regularly host the Marjoe Gortner Celebrity Sports Invitational charity ski events to raise money for charities such as the Dream Foundation and Robert F. Kennedy, Jr.'s Waterkeeper Alliance.

References

External links

Ski areas and resorts in Alberta
Banff, Alberta
Banff National Park